Roland Mark Schoeman  OIS (born 4 July 1980) is a South African American swimmer and was a member of the South African swimming team at the 2000, 2004, 2008 and 2012 Olympic Games. In May 2022, he officially became United States citizen.

Career
Born in Pretoria, Schoeman first took an interest in the sport when he was 13, and began to compete three years later. He said he began swimming only to impress a girl he met. This marked the beginning of a career that would see him attain a gold, silver and bronze medal at the 2004 Olympic Games; three gold, a silver and a bronze World Championship medals, as well as four gold, three silvers and three bronzes at the Commonwealth Games. He set new South African records in the 100 m Freestyle (48.69 s), 50 m Freestyle (22.04 s), 100 m Butterfly (52.73 s) and 50 m Butterfly (23.65 s) events.

He won a gold medal at the 2004 Summer Olympics in Athens in the 4 × 100 m freestyle, a silver medal in the 100 m freestyle event and a bronze in the 50 m freestyle. Three of the Men's 100 metre Freestyle team were in the team that broke the record and won gold at the 2006 Commonwealth Games. He also claimed golds in the 100m freestyle and 100m butterfly.

Schoeman, who is asthmatic, was voted the African Swimmer of the Year by Swimming World in 2004, 2005 and 2006; and the South African Swimmer of the Year in 2003, 2004, 2005 and 2006. He was elected South African Sports Star of the Year in 2004.

In 2007, he received the South African Presidential Award Order of Ikhamanga in Silver, awarded for excellent achievements in the field of swimming.

At the 2005 FINA World Aquatics Championships in Montreal, Quebec, Canada he won two gold medals [50 m Butterfly (in a world record time of 22.96 s) and Freestyle (21.69 s, the second fastest time in history at the time)]. He also claimed a silver in 100 m freestyle.

In December 2005, Schoeman turned down a 40 Million Rand (US$5.9 million) contract to swim for Qatar. He stated reasons of national pride for turning down the offer and that hearing the South African national anthem and sharing the joy of his victories with his fellow South Africans is what made winning gold special.

At the 2007 FINA World Aquatics Championships in Melbourne Australia he successfully defended his 50m butterfly title. He also made the final of the 50 m and 100 m freestyle and was part of the 4 × 100 m freestyle relay team that finished fourth.

On 6 September 2008 Roland Schoeman set a new short course meters (25 m pool) world record of 20.64 at South African Nationals. Schoeman lost his world record in late 2008 but regained his record in August 2009. At the South Africa Short Course Championships, Schoeman swam 20.30 seconds. This time was broken in 2014 by Florent Manaudou.

At the 2012 Summer Olympics in London, Schoeman, aged 32, advanced to the final in the men's 50 m freestyle, clocking a 21.80 to finish 0.46 seconds behind the gold medal winner, Florent Manaudou.

In 2016, Schoeman missed qualification for a fifth Olympics.

Career best times
Schoeman has broken three long course world records (two individual, one relay) and six short course world records (all individual).

Accolades
In 2004 he was inducted into the University of Pretoria Sport Hall of fame.

In 2007 he was inducted into the University of Arizona Sports Hall of Fame.

See also
 List of Commonwealth Games medallists in swimming (men)
 List of Olympic medalists in swimming (men)
 World record progression 50 metres freestyle
 World record progression 100 metres freestyle
 World record progression 50 metres butterfly
 World record progression 100 metres individual medley

References

External links
 
 
 
 
 
 

1980 births
Living people
Afrikaner people
Sportspeople from Pretoria
South African people of Dutch descent
University of Pretoria alumni
South African male swimmers
Male butterfly swimmers
South African male freestyle swimmers
Commonwealth Games gold medallists for South Africa
Commonwealth Games silver medallists for South Africa
Commonwealth Games bronze medallists for South Africa
Olympic swimmers of South Africa
Olympic gold medalists for South Africa
Olympic silver medalists for South Africa
Olympic bronze medalists for South Africa
Swimmers at the 2000 Summer Olympics
Swimmers at the 2004 Summer Olympics
Swimmers at the 2008 Summer Olympics
Swimmers at the 2012 Summer Olympics
Swimmers at the 1998 Commonwealth Games
Swimmers at the 2002 Commonwealth Games
Swimmers at the 2006 Commonwealth Games
Swimmers at the 2010 Commonwealth Games
World record holders in swimming
Olympic bronze medalists in swimming
World Aquatics Championships medalists in swimming
Medalists at the 2004 Summer Olympics
Recipients of the Order of Ikhamanga
Olympic gold medalists in swimming
Olympic silver medalists in swimming
Commonwealth Games medallists in swimming
Goodwill Games medalists in swimming
Competitors at the 2001 Goodwill Games
Medallists at the 2002 Commonwealth Games
Medallists at the 2006 Commonwealth Games
Medallists at the 2010 Commonwealth Games